North Carolina Highway 11 Bypass (NC 11 Byp.), is a , bypass route of NC 11 in Pitt County, North Carolina. The bypass is a four-lane freeway that runs between a junction with NC 11 south of Ayden to an interchange with U.S. Route 264 (US 264), US 13, NC 11, and NC 903 north of Greenville, wrapping around the west side of Ayden and Winterville and the northwest side of Greenville. The southern  of the route is known as the Greenville Southwest Bypass to locals, which was built due to plans relating  traffic alleviation the NC 11 and Stantonsburg Road corridors. The remaining  segment of the route is concurrent with US 264.

The Greenville Southwest Bypass was proposed due to the recent increased population growth of Greenville, which has led to congestion along the NC 11 corridor. Additionally, the bypass was also planned to help aid growth and development within the area. As such, the Southwest Bypass Land Use Plan was adopted by the Pitt County Board of Commissioners on October 15, 2018, in order to guide the design and scale of future development along the corridor.

Route description
The route begins as the Greenville Southwest Bypass at a partial interchange with NC 11 south of Ayden. The four-lane rural freeway wraps around the west side of Ayden using exit numbers that are based on mile markers of NC 11 mileage numbers. The route continues north to an interchange with NC 102 continuing northward through rural areas of Pitt County, including the Renston Rural Historic District, bypassing Winterville to the west and coming to two closely spaced diamond interchanges with Forlines Road and US 13 and US 264 Alternate (Dickinson Avenue). West of Greenville, the Greenville Southwest Bypass ends at a cloverleaf interchange with I-587, US 264, and Stantonsburg Road, with the NC 11 Bypass freeway continuing north concurrent with US 264. Wrapping around the city of Greenville to the northwest, the route now uses US 264's mile mileage numbers. The route intersects NC 43 and NC 33 before terminating at a folded diamond interchange with US 13/NC 11/NC 903, from which US 264 continues to the east as a four-lane partial controlled access highway.

History
In December 2007, the North Carolina Department of Transportation (NCDOT) completed a final environmental impact statement and also identified the preferred alternatives for the project. Due to the bypass's proposed routing passing through the Renston Rural Historic District, the design was modified in 2007 in order to lessen the freeway's impact on the district. The design changes included removing a proposed interchange at NC 903 and shifting the alignment of the bypass eastward. In August 2008, NCDOT released a record of decision for the project, detailing the chosen alternative. The acquisition of the right-of-way was completed in January 2015. Construction on the project began in September 2016, and the project was expected to be completed in June 2020. In May 2015, NCDOT awarded a $159 million contract to Barnhill Contracting, Sanford Contractors and HDR Design Group to design and construct the project, which was built via the design-build method. Initially, the project, which meets Interstate Highway standards, was expected to cost a total of $231.8 million, including $159 million for construction, and be completed by June 2020. However, the project was ahead of schedule and was expected to cost less than the original estimates and be completed by November 2019. The Greenville Southwest Bypass opened to traffic on November 22, 2019.

Exit list
Exit numbers are based on the mileage of NC 11 from its mainline route to Interstate 587.

References

External links

Transportation in Pitt County, North Carolina
011-Byp